Muhadhdhib al-Dīn Abūʼl-Hasan ʻAlī ibn Ahmad Ibn Habal known as Ibn Habal (c. 1122 - 1213) was an Arab physician and scientist born in Baghdad. He was known primarily for his medical compendium titled Kitab al-Mukhtarat fi al-tibb, "The Book of Selections in Medicine." It was written in 1165 in Mosul, north of Baghdad, where Ibn Hubal spent most of his life.

The chapters on kidney and bladder stones were edited and translated into French by P. de Koning in his Traité sur le calcul dans les reins et dans la vessie (1896). Other chapters have been translated by Dorothee Thies in Die Lehren der arabischen Mediziner Tabari und Ibn Hubal über Herz, Lunge, Gallenblase und Milz (1968).

See also 
List of Arab scientists and scholars

References

Physicians from the Abbasid Caliphate
People from Baghdad
1120s births
1213 deaths
12th-century physicians
12th-century people from the Abbasid Caliphate
12th-century Arabs